This is a list of weapons used by the United States Marine Corps:

Weapons used
The basic infantry weapon of the United States Marine Corps is the M27 Infantry Automatic Rifle. Suppressive fire is provided by the M240B machine gun, at the squad and company levels respectively. In addition, indirect fire is provided by the M320 grenade launcher in fireteams, M224a1 60 mm mortar in companies, and M252 81 mm mortar in battalions. The M2 .50 caliber heavy machine gun and MK19 automatic grenade launcher (40 mm) are available for use by dismounted infantry, though they are more commonly vehicle-mounted. Precision fire is provided by the M110 Semi-Automatic Sniper System and M40A3, A5, A6 bolt-action sniper rifle.

The Marine Corps uses a variety of direct-fire rockets and missiles to provide infantry with an offensive and defensive anti-armor capability. The SMAW and AT4 are unguided rockets that can destroy armor and fixed defenses (e.g. bunkers) at ranges up to 500 meters. The FGM-148 Javelin and BGM-71 TOW are anti-tank guided missiles; both can utilize top-attack profiles to avoid heavy frontal armor and are heavy missiles effective past 2,000 meters that give infantry an offensive capability against armor.

Marines are capable of deploying non-lethal weaponry as the situation dictates. Part of a Marine Expeditionary Unit earning the Special Operations Capable designator requires a company-sized unit capable of riot control.

Some older weapons are used for ceremonial purposes, such as the Silent Drill Platoon's M1 Garands, or the use of the M101 howitzer for gun salutes.

Active use

Non-lethal weapons
 CS gas
 OC spray
 Rubber, beanbag, & plastic bullet
 Riot shield
 Baton
 M6/M7 series chemical grenade
 M84 stun grenade
 Sting grenade

Bladed weapons
 United States Marine Raider stiletto
 OKC-3S bayonet
 Ka-Bar Combat Knife
 Marine NCO sword
 Marine Officers' Mameluke Sword
 Original United States Marine Corps Machete

Handguns
 Beretta M9
 Beretta M9A1
 Glock M007 - Adopted in February 2015 for use by MARSOC
 M45A1 - Modified M1911A1, for use by MEU(SOC) and MARSOC. Still in use by Recon Battalions, Security, and Emergency Services Battalions.
 M18 - Standard issue pistol since 2020 (replacing M9, M9A1, M45A1 and M007)

Assault rifles, Battle rifles

 M16A2, M16A4 - Select fire. Safe, semi, burst. Originally the basic infantry weapon, mostly being replaced by M27 in infantry battalions.
 M4/M4A1 - Mostly being replaced by M27 in infantry battalions. Commonly issued for non-infantry marines as of 2010.
 M27 Infantry Automatic Rifle - Support weapon based on the Heckler & Koch HK416 (itself a piston-driven M16) using a free-floating barrel. Initially issued as a replacement for the M249, in 2018 the decision was made to adopt the M27 as the standard USMC assault rifle in infantry battalions.
 MK18 Mod 1 - Modified M4 with 10.3-inch barrel. Used by MARSOC
 Mk 17 Mod 0 used by MARSOC
 Mk 16 Mod 0 used by MARSOC

Designated Marksman Rifles
 M39 Enhanced Marksman Rifle - Improved marksman version of the M14 rifle.
 Mk 12 Mod 1 - Improved marksman version of the M16 rifle.
 M38 Designated Marksman Rifle - Modified M27 IAR fielded as a marksman rifle

Sniper Rifles
 Mk 13 mod 7 - .300 Winchester Magnum chambered sniper rifle built on Accuracy International Chassis System with Remington 700 long action.
 Mk 11 Mod 0 - 7.62×51mm sniper rifle based on the M16 direct impingement gas system.
 M110 Semi-Automatic Sniper System - Improved version of the Mk 11, replacing the M39 and Mk 11.
 M40 rifle - M40A3, M40A5 and M40A6 variants in use as sniper rifles. 
 Barrett 50 Cal/M82/M107 - in use as the M82A3 and M107 variants. The M82A3 being an upgraded M82A1A, and the M107 being a variant made in response to requirements issued for an anti-materiel rifle.
 M21 - modified M14 rifle

Shotguns
 Remington 870 - as the M870 (by Marine Security Guard) and Modular Combat Shotgun.
 Benelli M1014 - semi automatic 12-gauge shotgun.
 Mossberg 590A1 12-gauge pump

Submachine Guns
 Colt 9mm SMG - variant of the M16 chambered in 9×19mm Parabellum, used by Marine Security Guard
 Heckler & Koch MP5

Machine Guns

 M2HB - heavy machine gun chambered in .50 BMG used primarily on vehicles.
 M240G - 7.62×51mm medium machine gun used by infantry, and light vehicles and helicopters.
 Mk48 Mod 1 - 7.62×51mm light machine gun, used by US MARSOC.
 M249E4 - 5.56×45mm light machine gun, infantry support weapon. Not replaced, but being supplanted by the M27 IAR.

Hand Grenades
 M67 Hand Grenade (Fragmentation)
 AN-M14 Hand Grenade (Incendiary)
 Mk 141 Mod 0 Hand Grenade "flash-bang"
 AN-M18 Smoke grenade

Grenade Launchers

 M203A1/A2 40 mm Rifle-Mounted Grenade Launcher
 M320 Grenade Launcher Module
 M32 MGL 40mm 6 shot Revolver type Grenade Launcher 
 MK19 40 mm Automatic Grenade Launcher

Mortars
 M224 60 mm Mortar
 M252 81 mm Extended Range Mortar
 M327 120 mm Expeditionary Fire Support System

Artillery

 M777 155mm Lightweight Howitzer
 High Mobility Artillery Rocket System (HIMARS)
 Lightweight 105 mm Howitzer Gun

Shoulder-fired Missile and Rocket Launchers
 M72 LAW
M202 FLASH
 M136 AT4 Anti-Tank Weapon
 MK153 Shoulder-launched Multipurpose Assault Weapon (SMAW II)
 FGM-148 Javelin Anti-Tank missile
 BGM-71 Tube Launched, Optically Tracked, Wire Guided (TOW) Missile Weapon System
 FIM-92 Stinger anti-aircraft missile

Vehicle-mounted Weapons
 M240G 7.62 mm Medium Machine Gun
 M2 .50 Caliber Machine Gun
 M48 Turret-type .50 Caliber Machine Gun
 MK19 40 mm Grenade Machine Gun
 BGM-71 Tube Launched, Optically Tracked, Wire Guided (TOW) Missile Weapon System
 M242 Bushmaster 25mm Autocannon
 M256A1 120 mm smoothbore gun

Aircraft-mounted Weapons

Guns
 GAU-12/U 25 mm Gatling gun
 GAU-16/A .50 Caliber Machine gun
 GAU-17/A 7.62 mm automatic gun
 GAU-21/A .50 Caliber Machine gun
 GAU-8/A Avenger 30mm Gatling cannon
 M61A1 20 mm automatic cannon
 M197 20 mm automatic cannon
Bombs
 CBU-99 Cluster Bomb
 GBU-10 2000 lb laser-guided bomb
 GBU-12 500 lb laser-guided bomb
 GBU-16 1000 lb laser-guided bomb
 MK82 series 500 lb bomb
 MK83 series 1000 lb bomb
 MK84 series 2000 lb bomb
 Mk 77 incendiary bomb
Missiles
 Naval Strike Missile 
 AGM-65 Maverick
 AGM-84 Harpoon
 AGM-88 HARM
 AGM-114 Hellfire
 AGM-154 Joint Standoff Weapon
 AIM-7 Sparrow
 AIM-9 Sidewinder
 AIM-120 AMRAAM
 Hydra 70
 M260 70 mm Rocket Launcher
 Advanced Precision Kill Weapon System

Other
 M18A1 Claymore anti-personnel mine
 M15 anti-tank mine
 M19 anti-tank mine
 M21 anti-tank mine
 M58 Mine Clearing Line Charge (MICLIC)
 Marine Corps Martial Arts Program (MCMAP)

Accessories

 Advanced Combat Optical Gunsight (ACOG), recently renamed Rifle Combat Optic (RCO)
 ITL MARS reflex sight
 AN/PSQ-18 day/night grenade launcher sight
 AN/PVS-7A Passive/Active night vision device
 AN/PVS-10 night vision sight
 AN/PVS-14 night vision sight
 AN/PVS-17 night vision sight
 AN/PVS-21 night vision sight
 AN/PVS-31 night vision sight
 AN/PAS-13 thermal sight
 AN/PAQ-4 IR laser sight
 AN/PEQ-15 IR laser sight
 various suppressors (MARSOC and Reconnaissance units only)
 various tactical lights
 M2 tripod for light and medium machine guns
 M122 tripod for light and medium machine guns
 M3 tripod for heavy machine guns

Testing/limited use
Marines with MARSOC, Force Reconnaissance, and MEU(SOC)s occasionally use specialized weapons that the rest of the fleet does not. In addition, some weapons are tested and evaluated in select units before acceptance and large-scale adoption. In a few cases, older weapons are brought out of retirement for limited use.

 M45A1 Close Quarter Battle Pistol - issued to Force Reconnaissance, MARSOC and Special Reaction Team (SRT)
High Standard HDM (.22 LR) (USMC Force Recon, limited issue of 10 per company)
 Heckler & Koch MP5-N  - MARSOC, Force Reconnaissance and SRT only
 Multi-shot Accessory Underbarrel Launcher - in evaluation
 Mk 18 CQBR - subcompact variant of the M4 carbine which replaces burst fire with fully automatic capabilities - Force Recon
 FN SCAR - MARSOC only
 Mk 12 Special Purpose Rifle - MARSOC only
 Glock 19 - MARSOC

Retired
Bladed Weapons

 M9 Bayonet
 M7 Bayonet
 M6 Bayonet
 M5 Bayonet
 Raider stiletto
 M1 Bayonet
 M1942 Bayonet
 M1917 Bayonet
 M1905 Bayonet

Pistols

 M1911
 S&W Model 10
 S&W Model 66
 M1905 Marine
 1873 Colt Single Action
 Colt M1861 Navy
 Colt 1851 Navy Revolver
 Harper's Ferry Model 1805

Rifles, Carbines, & Muskets

 United States Marine Corps Squad Advanced Marksman Rifle (SAM-R)
 Designated Marksman Rifle (DMR)
 M16A1/M16A2
 M14 Rifle
 M1 Garand
 M1917 Enfield
 M1903 Springfield
 Springfield Model 1892-99
 M1895 Lee Navy
 Springfield Model 1882 Short Rifle
 M1872 Springfield
 Spencer repeating rifle
 Springfield Model 1863
 Springfield Model 1861
 1853 Enfield musket
 Springfield Model 1855
 M1819 Hall Rifle
 Model 1816 Musket
 Springfield Model 1812 Musket
 Model 1795 Musket
 M1/M2/M3 carbine
 M50 Reising
 Colt Model 733

Submachine guns

 Model of 1921 Thompson
 Model of 1928 and M1928A1 Thompson
 M50 and M55 Reising
 M1 and M1A1 Thompson
 M3 and M3A1
 Heckler & Koch MP5 (some variants)

Machine guns

 M1895 Colt–Browning machine gun
 Hotchkiss M1909 Benét–Mercié machine gun
 M1917 Browning machine gun
 M1918 Browning Automatic Rifle
 M1919 Browning machine gun
 M60 machine gun
Quad 50

Explosives & Launchers

 M61 hand grenade
 Mk2 hand grenade
 FGM-172 Predator Short-Range Assault Weapon (SRAW)
 M79 grenade launcher
 XM148 grenade launcher
 M75 grenade launcher
 M29 mortar
 M19 mortar
 M1 mortar
 M2 mortar

 M101 Howitzer
 M102 Howitzer
 M114 155 MM Howitzer
 M59 Field Gun
 M116 Howitzer
 M67 Recoilless Rifle
 M20 Recoilless Rifle
 M47 Dragon Anti-tank Missile System
 Bazooka Series Rocket Launcher
 FIM-43 Redeye Anti-aircraft Missile
 MIM-23 Hawk Anti-aircraft Missile
 M2 Flamethrower

Aircraft/vehicle-mounted
 M2/M3 cannon
 M85 Machine Gun
 M73/M219 Machine Gun

Other
 Linear Infighting Neural Override Engagement (LINE) Combat System
 AN/PVS-4 Night Vision Sight
 AN/TVS-5 Night Vision Sight

See also
 List of individual weapons of the U.S. Armed Forces
 List of crew-served weapons of the U.S. Armed Forces
 Lists of weapons
 List of firearms
 U.S. Helicopter Armament Subsystems
 Rubber duck (military)

References

External links 
 

Articles containing video clips
U.S. Marine Corps
United States Marine Corps lists
Marine Corps